Franz Weiss or Weiß may refer to: 
 Franz Weiss (violist), Austrian violinist and viola player
 Franz Weiß (politician), German politician